Canadian National Railway (CN) Class I-8 steam locomotives were of 4-6-0 wheel arrangement in the Whyte notation, or " 2'C " in UIC classification. These locomotives were built for the Grand Trunk Railway (GT) from 1906 through 1908 for passenger service. Most were scrapped in the 1930s, but number 1620 remained operational through World War II.

References 

4-6-0 locomotives
ALCO locomotives
Baldwin locomotives
MLW locomotives
I-8
Scrapped locomotives
Passenger locomotives